Reginald Kilocksley Green (1873 – 6 March 1940) was an Irish first-class cricketer.

Green was born at Killorglin in County Kerry sometime in 1873. He later played first-class cricket in British India for the Europeans, debuting in the 1915/16 Madras Presidency against the Indians. He played in the next four editions of the tournament, making four further first-class appearances. He scored a total of 246 runs in his five matches, averaging 24.60, with a highest score of 78. With the ball, he took 6 wickets at a bowling average of 31.33, with best figures of 2/21. He later returned from India and settled in England, where he died at Isleworth in March 1940.

References

External links

1873 births
1940 deaths
People from Killorglin
Irish cricketers
Europeans cricketers